RökFlöte is the upcoming 23rd studio album by progressive rock band Jethro Tull, it will be released on 21 April 2023.

The followup to The Zealot Gene (2022), this is the shortest gap between Jethro Tull studio albums since 1980.

Overview 
On 17 November 2022, on Jethro Tull's Facebook page, Ian Anderson announced that they were working on their next studio album and that it would be released in Spring of 2023 stating that Bruce Soord of The Pineapple Thief had just finished Surround Sound Mix and Alternate Stereo Mixes of the album. The album mostly revolves around the characters, roles, and principal gods in Norse Paganism, as well as "Rock Flute". The name of the album comes from "Rock Flute" as the original idea was to make an album of mostly instrumental flute music. But eventually Ian Anderson stated that he was drawn to the phrase Ragnarök with "rök" meaning destiny, course, or direction. Ian Anderson would then change "Flute" to "Flöte" to "keep with the spelling". The album will be released as a double LP, CD, and Bluray as well as a deluxe edition featuring bonus demos, an interview with Ian Anderson, and a bonus track.

Track listing

Personnel 

 Ian Anderson - concert and alto flutes, flute d'amour, Irish whistle and vocals
 David Goodier - bass
 John O'Hara - piano, keyboards, Hammond organ
 Scott Hammond - drums
 Joe Parrish-James - electric and acoustic guitars, mandolin

References 

Jethro Tull (band) albums
2023 albums
Upcoming albums